Farmacias Moscoso, commonly known as Moscoso, was a Puerto Rican pharmacy chain that evolved into a large company from its creation in Ponce, Puerto Rico during 1898. It was first known as Droguerias Moscoso.

History

The first Moscoso pharmacy was opened during 1898 by Teodoro Moscoso Rodriguez, the father of Teodoro Moscoso and namesake of the Teodoro Moscoso bridge. Moscoso, Jr. himself once worked as an employee of the original Moscoso pharmacy location in Ponce, giving him formative work in the business area, which would later form part of the basis for Operation Bootstrap, an initiative of his and governor Luis Munoz Marin.

By the 1980s, there were Moscoso pharmacies in many other cities in Puerto Rico, including Aibonito, Bayamon, Caguas, Guaynabo, Humacao, San Juan, Yabucoa and Yauco.

In 1995, the chain was bought over by Farmacias El Amal, a competitor, and the brand disappeared. Other competitors included Walgreens.

Aibonito location
The Aibonito Moscoso former location is considered a local historical landmark and hosts a museum dedicated to the pharmaceutical retail chain.

Collectible items
Some Farmacias Moscoso advertising materials are considered valuable collector's items, such as postcards, hand fans, etc.

Other pharmacies
Moscoso Pharmacies is not related to other pharmacies similarly named, namely one in The Bronx, New York, U.S.A., one in Venado Tuerto, Argentina and one in Puebla, Puebla, Mexico, the Mexican one which is named Distribuidora Moscoso.

External links

1898 establishments in Puerto Rico
1995 disestablishments in Puerto Rico
Puerto Rican brands
Defunct pharmacies
Pharmacies of Puerto Rico